The Leff is a river in Brittany, France. It flows into the Trieux near Pontrieux.

Places in or near Leff 
In the valley of Leff, there is a town called Châtelaudren.

References 

Rivers of France
Rivers of Brittany
Rivers of Côtes-d'Armor
1Leff